Crow Observatory is a historic observatory housed in the Crow Hall in the Physics Department on the Danforth Campus of Washington University in St. Louis. The historic telescope is still in use, and the observatory is open to the public.

Telescope and transit
The University purchased the observatory's refractor telescope in 1863.  The telescope is named the Yeatman refractor, after philanthropist James Yeatman who donated US$1,500 for its construction.   The Yeatman Refractor has an aperture of 6 inches, with lenses made by Henry Fitz & Co.  The transit was made in 1882, and the clock was made in 1885.

History
The observatory was originally located on 18th Street in St. Louis City; it was moved with the rest of the University to the Danforth Campus upon the conclusion of the 1904 World's Fair.  The current observatory dome was built in 1954, when the Yeatman refractor telescope was relocated from where Louderman Hall currently stands.

See also
 List of astronomical observatories

References

External links
 Crow Observatory - Washington University Physics Department

Washington University in St. Louis campus
Astronomical observatories in Missouri
Tourist attractions in St. Louis
Education in St. Louis
1954 establishments in Missouri